Săvârșin Castle is a large Country house situated in Săvârșin Park, a  private estate that was owned by King Michael I of the Romanians (1921–2017) in Săvârșin, Arad County, Romania.

It is the Romanian Royal Family’s official country residence where the statutes defining the role and powers of the Royal Family are signed. King Michael I and Queen Anne spent their annual Christmas Holidays here following the Castle's restitution to royal ownership, a tradition continued by Margareta, Custodian of the Romanian Crown. Since 2021 the Castle grounds and King Michael's collection of WW2 Jeeps have been open to the public during the Summer.

History
Formerly known as Forray Castle, Săvârșin was owned by various Hungarian noble families for three centuries during the territory owned by the Kingdom of Hungary until the Union of Transylvania with Romania. In mid-18th century, at the center of the estate on which the current Royal Castle lies, there was a building raised in western baroque style (dating from 1680), that belonged to the Edelspacher de Gyorok noble family. After having been set on fire in November 1784 by the peasants in the uprise led by Horia, Closca and Crisan, and needed being restored from the foundations, the castle had various owners, till 1858 when it became the possession of Leopold Count Nádasdy de Nádasd et Fogarasföld, the one who re-built it in its present form in 1860.

In 1941, following an exchange of properties, the Castle became the property of the Mocioni-Starcea family, who prepared the Castle for so-called "crown weekends". In 1943, the Castle became the property of King Michael I, who was the king of Romania at that time and bought the Castle from the Crown property as a gift for his mother Queen Helen.

Nationalization and later usage
The Castle was nationalized by the communist authorities after King Michael's abdication in 1947. Consequently, it was used as a hospital for internal diseases, a tuberculosis sanatorium and nervous disorders sanatorium until 1967, when Romanian leader Nicolae Ceaușescu decided to turn it into a guest house for visiting heads of state.

Return to ownership
In 2000 the High Court of Cassation and Justice declared that the entire property and land was to be restored to King Michael I. On certain occasions, the Royal Estate is open to the public and the building can be seen from a closer distance. Traditionally, the Royal Family spends the winter holidays at Savârșin, on which occasion many groups come to sing carols for the former sovereign and the royal family. The carol singers come from the nearby villages, but also from other communities in Arad county as well as from the neighbouring counties of Alba, Hunedoara, and Timiș. On Christmas Day, the family members take part in the religious service at the Orthodox church in the village.

Public opening
On 10 May (Monarchy Day) 2021 Margareta, Custodian of the Romanian Crown formally opened the grounds and Royal Automobile Museum to the public. The park & gardens, King Michael's collection of World War II Jeeps, his recreated Car Workshop and the Royal Courtyard are now open to the public during the Summer months.

See also
Romanian Royal Family
Elisabeta Palace
Peleş Castle
Pelișor Castle
 List of castles in Romania
 Tourism in Romania

References

External links
 Savarsin Royal Estate Official Website
 Romanian Royal Family Collection Foundation

20th century in Transylvania
Royal residences in Romania
Castles in Romania
Buildings and structures in Arad County
1948 in Romania
2007 in Romania